Ismaël Koné is a Canadian soccer midfielder.

Ismael Kone may also refer to:

 Ismael Koné (boxer) (born 1974), Swedish boxer
 Ismaël Koné (footballer, born 1988), French football midfielder